Alexei Efros may refer to:

Alexei L. Efros (born 1938), American physicist
Alexei A. Efros (born 1975), American computer scientist